Freie Presse (German for Free Press) is the name of several newspapers, including:

 Freie Presse (Saxony), published since 1963 in the Chemnitz region, Germany
 Freie Presse (Alsace), which existed from 1898 to 1960 in Alsace, France (a German region for some of that period)
 Neue Freie Presse, which existed from 1864 to 1939 in Vienna, Austria. It was a forerunner of today's Die Presse.
 Dakota Freie Presse, a German-language paper in North America, 1874-1954
 Cincinnatier Freie Presse, a German-language paper in Cincinnati, Ohio, 1874-1964